The 2019 UEFA European Under-19 Championship qualifying competition was a men's under-19 football competition that determined the seven teams joining the automatically qualified hosts Armenia in the 2019 UEFA European Under-19 Championship final tournament.

Apart from Armenia, all remaining 54 UEFA member national teams entered the qualifying competition. Players born on or after 1 January 2000 were eligible to participate. Starting from this season, up to five substitutions are permitted per team in each match.

Format
The qualifying competition consists of two rounds:
Qualifying round: Apart from Portugal and Germany, which receive byes to the elite round as the teams with the highest seeding coefficient, the remaining 52 teams are drawn into 13 groups of four teams. Each group is played in single round-robin format at one of the teams selected as hosts after the draw. The 13 group winners and the 13 runners-up advance to the elite round.
Elite round: The 28 teams are drawn into seven groups of four teams. Each group is played in single round-robin format at one of the teams selected as hosts after the draw. The seven group winners qualify for the final tournament.

The schedule of each group is as follows, with two rest days between each matchday (Regulations Article 19.04):

Tiebreakers
In the qualifying round and elite round, teams are ranked according to points (3 points for a win, 1 point for a draw, 0 points for a loss), and if tied on points, the following tiebreaking criteria are applied, in the order given, to determine the rankings (Regulations Articles 14.01 and 14.02):
Points in head-to-head matches among tied teams;
Goal difference in head-to-head matches among tied teams;
Goals scored in head-to-head matches among tied teams;
If more than two teams are tied, and after applying all head-to-head criteria above, a subset of teams are still tied, all head-to-head criteria above are reapplied exclusively to this subset of teams;
Goal difference in all group matches;
Goals scored in all group matches;
Penalty shoot-out if only two teams have the same number of points, and they met in the last round of the group and are tied after applying all criteria above (not used if more than two teams have the same number of points, or if their rankings are not relevant for qualification for the next stage);
Disciplinary points (red card = 3 points, yellow card = 1 point, expulsion for two yellow cards in one match = 3 points);
UEFA coefficient for the qualifying round draw;
Drawing of lots.

Qualifying round

Draw
The draw for the qualifying round was held on 6 December 2017, 10:00 CET (UTC+1), at the UEFA headquarters in Nyon, Switzerland.

The teams were seeded according to their coefficient ranking, calculated based on the following (a four-year window was used instead of the previous three-year window):
2014 UEFA European Under-19 Championship final tournament and qualifying competition (qualifying round and elite round)
2015 UEFA European Under-19 Championship final tournament and qualifying competition (qualifying round and elite round)
2016 UEFA European Under-19 Championship final tournament and qualifying competition (qualifying round and elite round)
2017 UEFA European Under-19 Championship final tournament and qualifying competition (qualifying round and elite round)

Each group contained one team from Pot A, one team from Pot B, one team from Pot C, and one team from Pot D. For political reasons, Spain and Gibraltar, Serbia and Kosovo, and Bosnia and Herzegovina and Kosovo would not be drawn in the same group.

Notes
Teams marked in bold have qualified for the final tournament.

Groups
The qualifying round must be played by 20 November 2018.

Times up to 27 October 2018 are CEST (UTC+2), thereafter times are CET (UTC+1), as listed by UEFA (local times, if different, are in parentheses).

Group 1

Group 2

Group 3

Group 4

Group 5

Group 6

Group 7

Group 8

Group 9

Group 10

Group 11

Group 12

Group 13

Elite round

Draw
The draw for the elite round was held on 6 December 2018, 11:00 CET (UTC+1), at the UEFA headquarters in Nyon, Switzerland.

The teams were seeded according to their results in the qualifying round. Portugal and Germany, which received byes to the elite round, were automatically seeded into Pot A. Each group contained one team from Pot A, one team from Pot B, one team from Pot C, and one team from Pot D. Teams from the same qualifying round group could not be drawn in the same group. For political reasons, Russia and Ukraine would not be drawn in the same group.

Groups
The elite round is scheduled to be played on the following FIFA International Match Calendar dates unless all four teams agree to play on another date:
18–26 March 2019

Times are CET (UTC+1), as listed by UEFA (local times, if different, are in parentheses).

Group 1

Group 2

Group 3

Group 4

Group 5

Group 6

Group 7

Qualified teams
The following eight teams qualify for the final tournament.

1 Bold indicates champions for that year. Italic indicates hosts for that year.

Goalscorers
In the qualifying round, 
In the elite round, 
In total,

References

External links

Qualification
2019
2018 in youth association football
2019 in youth association football
October 2018 sports events in Europe
November 2018 sports events in Europe
March 2019 sports events in Europe